"Let's Make a Night to Remember" is a song written by Canadian rock artist Bryan Adams, and Robert John "Mutt" Lange. It was recorded by Adams and released on August 12, 1996, as the second single from his seventh studio album, 18 til I Die (1996). The song's musical-style and production were heavily inspired by rock and pop music from the 1980s, and its lyrics chronicle a relationship.

This song was the third single from the album to chart in the United States, peaking at number 24 on the Billboard Hot 100, and was Adams' eighth number-one single in Canada, topping the RPM Top Singles chart for two weeks. It additionally reached number one on the UK Rock Chart and the top 10 in Australia and on the UK Singles Chart.

Critical reception
Paul Verna from Billboard described the song as an "epic ballad". The magazine's Larry Flick felt that "this rhythmic ballad is a far more obvious top 40 entry than Adams' previous
single, "The Only Thing That Looks Good On Me (Is You)"—but it's not nearly as much fun." He added, "Still, this cut is notches above its competition in quality. And Adams succeeds in lowering his well-worn rasp to a sexy whisper here, transforming simple words of love into an irresistible seduction. Gratefully, the band kicks through the walls of synths with enough rock bite to keep this track from withering into fluff." Daina Darzin from Cash Box noted that it "sports a languid, romantic groove." British magazine Music Week rated the song three out of five, adding, "A smoochier ballad than of late, from his 18 'Til I Die album, although it retains the classic Adams' touch. Another hit."

Charts

Weekly charts

Year-end charts

Certifications

Release history

References

Bryan Adams songs
1990s ballads
1996 singles
1996 songs
A&M Records singles
Rock ballads
RPM Top Singles number-one singles
Song recordings produced by Robert John "Mutt" Lange
Songs written by Bryan Adams
Songs written by Robert John "Mutt" Lange